Samaresh Mitra (born 1937) is an Indian bioinorganic chemist and an INSA Senior Scientist at the Indian Institute of Chemical Biology (IICB). He is known for his researches on inorganic paramagnetic complexes and low-symmetry transition metal complexes and is an elected fellow of the Indian National Science Academy, the National Academy of Sciences, India and the Indian Academy of Sciences. The Council of Scientific and Industrial Research, the apex agency of the Government of India for scientific research, awarded him the Shanti Swarup Bhatnagar Prize for Science and Technology, one of the highest Indian science awards, in 1983, for his contributions to chemical sciences.

Biography 

Born on 17 March 1940 in the Indian state of West Bengal, Samaresh Mitra graduated in chemistry from Deen Dayal Upadhyay Gorakhpur University and completed his master's degree form the same institution. Enrolling for his doctoral studies in 1962 at Indian Association for the Cultivation of Science (IACS) where he had the opportunity to work under the guidance of Akshayananda Bose, a renowned chemist, he secured DPhil in 1966 and moved to University of Melbourne the same year for his post-doctoral studies at the department of chemistry of the university. On his return to India in 1970, he started his career by joining the Tata Institute of Fundamental Research (TIFR) where he spent his entire academic career till his superannuation as a Senior Professor in 2003. Subsequently, he moved to Indian Institute of Chemical Biology (IICB) as a Raja Ramman fellow where he continues as an INSA Senior Scientist. During the course of his career, he served as a visiting scholar at the University of Oxford, as a visiting professor at Ohio State University, University of Pennsylvania, University of North Carolina, Australian National University and Monash University and as a visiting fellow at Tezpur University.

Legacy 
Mitra's researches were focused on physico-chemical and spectroscopic studies of the bimolecular systems. He deployed single crystal magnetic anisotropy and Nuclear magnetic resonance spectroscopy for investigating inorganic paramagnetic complexes such as metalloporphyrins and low-symmetry transition metal complexes and his work is reported to have widened our understanding of their electronic structures. His contribution to magnetochemistry is marked by the methodologies he developed to measure single crystal susceptibilities. Working on the magnetic and electronic properties of phthalocynines, metal porphyrins and similar inorganic materials, the team led by him discovered the molecular ferromagnet and elucidated their electronic structures for the first time. He also elucidated a method for the determination of the electronic structures of low symmetry systems utilizing their single crystal magnetic properties, also reported to be a first time discovery. Later in his career, he studied metal enzymes and proteins with regard to their enzyme-substrate interaction, molecular recognition, drug metabolism as well as the catalytic functions of several enzymes and these studies have assisted in resolving problems faced by the researchers in their metabolic and catalytic pathway.

Mitra's researches have been documented in over 140 articles published in peer-reviewed journals and several authors have quoted his work. Besides, he has also contributed chapters to seven books authored by others, including Single Crystal Magnetic Study on Ferromagnetic Manganese (II) Phthalocyanine, published by the Defense Technical Information Center in 1982. On the academic front, he established a bioinorganic chemistry laboratory at Tata Institute of Fundamental Research and organised an international conference series on bioinorganic chemistry which is now conducted every four years. He was among the group of scientists who initiated the Modern Trends In Inorganic Chemistry, a bi-annual conference in 1985 and serves as a member of its national advisory committee. He is also associated with a number of journals as their editorial board member and has sat in various committees set up by the Department of Science and Technology, Council of Scientific and Industrial Research and the University Grants Commission of India.

Awards and honors 
The Council of Scientific and Industrial Research awarded Samaresh Mitra the Shanti Swarup Bhatnagar Prize, India's highest award in science, in 1983. He received the Silver Medal of the Chemical Research Society of India in 2002 and D. S. Kothari Memorial Gold Medal of the Indian Science Congress Association in 2005. An elected scholar of the St John's College, Oxford in 1986, he is an elected fellow of all the three major Indian science academies, viz. Indian National Science Academy, Indian Academy of Sciences, and the National Academy of Sciences, India. The award orations delivered by him include INSA S. Swaminathan 60th Birthday Commemoration Lecture (1998) and C. Natarajan Endowment Medal of Madurai Kamaraj University (1998).

Selected bibliography

Books

Articles

See also 
 Ferromagnetism
 Magnetochemistry

Notes

References

Further reading 
 

Recipients of the Shanti Swarup Bhatnagar Award in Chemical Science
1937 births
Living people
Indian scientific authors
Fellows of the Indian Academy of Sciences
Fellows of the Indian National Science Academy
Fellows of The National Academy of Sciences, India
Scientists from West Bengal
Deen Dayal Upadhyay Gorakhpur University alumni
University of Melbourne alumni
Academic staff of Tata Institute of Fundamental Research
Fellows of St John's College, Oxford
Ohio State University faculty
University of Pennsylvania faculty
University of North Carolina at Chapel Hill faculty
Academic staff of the Australian National University
Academic staff of Monash University
Tezpur University